Anna Andreussi (born 17 April 1972) is an Italian rally co-driver best known for her partnership with her husband Paolo Andreucci.

Biography
Andreussi debuted in rally competition in 1994, first as a driver and then as a co-driver. In 2001 she became the co-driver of Paolo Andreucci. The two later got married. Andreussi and Andreucci has won ten Italian Rally Championship.

WRC results

IRC results 
Complete results from 1994 are here.

Other results
 Italian Rally Championship
9 wins (2003, 2006, 2009, 2010, 2011, 2012, 2014, 2015, 2017)

References

External links
 Co-driver profile at Ewrc-results.com
 Co-driver profile at Rallybase.nl

Living people
Racing drivers from Turin
1972 births
Female rally drivers
Italian rally co-drivers
Italian female racing drivers